Daytime Divas is an American satirical comedy-drama television series developed by Amy and Wendy Engelberg for VH1. It is based on the 2011 book Satan's Sisters by former co-host of The View Star Jones. The show stars Vanessa Williams, Chloe Bridges, Camille Guaty, Fiona Gubelmann, and McKinley Freeman. Principal photography began in August 2016 in Atlanta, Georgia. The series premiered on June 5, 2017. On November 1, 2017, VH1 cancelled the series after one season.

Premise
Maxine is the creator and lead host of the popular daytime television talk show The Lunch Hour, which also includes co-hosts Mo, Kibby, Nina, and Heather. On-air, they are great friends, but behind the scenes, they live in a world of power struggles and super-egos. Meanwhile, Maxine's former assistant, Anna, returns as the hard investigative journalist working for a great magazine, who wants to expose the truth about Maxine.

Cast

Main
 Vanessa Williams as Maxine Robinson, the creator and lead host of the daytime television show The Lunch Hour. She is one of the greatest personalities on American television and mother of Shawn
 Chloe Bridges as Kibby Ainsley, a former child star and recovering addict who is one of the co-hosts
 Camille Guaty as Nina Sandoval, a Pulitzer Prize-winning investigative journalist and one of the co-hosts
 Fiona Gubelmann as Heather Flynn-Kellogg, an outspoken conservative and one of the co-hosts
 McKinley Freeman as Shawn Robinson, the producer of The Lunch Hour and Maxine's adopted son

Recurring

 Tichina Arnold (credited as a "special guest star") as Mo Evans, an eccentric comedienne and one of the show's co-hosts
 Niko Pepaj as Leon, an ambitious head production assistant
 Sarah Mack as Ramona Davies, a production assistant
 Tammy Blanchard as Sheree Ainsley, Kibby's scheming mother
 Ness Bautista as Andrew Weller, Nina's husband and a rising politician
 Rich McDonald as Brad Kellogg, Heather's husband and a race car driver
 Adam J. Harrington as Jason Abel, a network president
 Norm Lewis as William Tomas, the doorman at Maxine's co-op building, who knows some of her darkest secrets
 Kristen Johnston as Anna Crouse, Maxine's former assistant and current editor-in-chief of a great magazine, who wants to expose the truth about the behind the scenes of The Lunch Hour
 Cassady McClincy as Tandy Ainsley, Kibby's younger sister
 Scott Evans as Julian, a celebrity sober coach who helps Kibby keep her life on track

Guest

 Tamera Mowry-Housley as herself
 Kelly Osbourne as herself
 Tasha Smith as Portia Camden, a popular lifestyle guru and the ladies' counselor who is brought on to guest host
 Debby Ryan as Maddie Finn, Kibby's rival and former Lacey from Outer Spacey co-star, who wants to ruin Kibby's life
 La La Anthony as Isabel Carlisle, a crisis management expert hired by Maxine to help handle a situation in behind the scenes
 Joy Behar as herself
 Sunny Hostin as herself
 Jedediah Bila as herself
 Sara Haines as herself
 Eve as Cecile James, a bestselling author of books about alpha women who guest hosts, and who initially wants to become a permanent co-host
 Richard T. Jones as Ben Branson, a charismatic real estate mogul who is set up on a blind date with Maxine
 Patti LaBelle as Gloria Tomas, the mother of William, who also has secrets
 Janet Mock as herself, who appears as a guest host on the show
 Jillian Rose Reed as Kali Z, a millennial YouTuber brought on as a guest host
 Rob Estes as Vance Gordon, an actor and Kibby's former Lacey from Outter Spacey co-star
 Star Jones as herself
 Ashley Graham as herself, who appears as a guest host on the show
 Zeeko Zaki as Cab Driver

Episodes

Production
On February 18, 2016, VH1 announced a television adaptation of Star Jones' best-selling book Satan's Sisters for 2017. The series is based on real behind-the-scenes events of The View, which Jones appeared on between 1997 and 2006. Vanessa Williams was announced as lead role on March 1. The show's head writers are Amy and Wendy Engelberg; it is directed by J. Miller Tobin. Production began in August 2016, and the series was retitled Daytime Divas. Tichina Arnold, Chloe Bridges, Camille Guaty and Fiona Gubelmann were announced as the other co-lead roles on August 22.

Reception
On the review aggregator Rotten Tomatoes, the series holds an approval rating of 60% based on 10 reviews, with an average rating of 6.45/10. The website's critics consensus reads, "These Divas try a little too hard achieve genuine camp, but fans of prima donnas will find a catty enough array here." On Metacritic, the show has a score of 53 out of 100 based on four reviews, indicating "mixed or average reviews".

References

External links
 
 

2010s American comedy-drama television series
2010s American LGBT-related comedy television series
2010s American LGBT-related drama television series
2010s American satirical television series
2017 American television series debuts
2017 American television series endings
English-language television shows
Serial drama television series
Television shows based on American novels
Television series about television
Television series by Sony Pictures Television
Television shows filmed in Atlanta
Television shows set in New York City
Transgender-related television shows
VH1 original programming